Makati's at-large congressional district may refer to two occasions when a city-wide or provincewide at-large district was used for elections to the Regular Batasang Pambansa from Makati in the Philippines.

Makati first gained a separate representation in 1984 when it returned one representative to the Regular Batasang Pambansa. The municipality continued to constitute a separate congressional district under the new constitution proclaimed on February 11, 1987. It was divided into two districts when Makati became a city pursuant to Republic Act No. 7854 and approved by plebiscite on February 4, 1995. Electing separate representatives was later administered in 1998.

Before Makati gained a separate representation, it was a part of Manila's at-large congressional district from 1898 to 1899 (as part of the province of Manila) and from 1943 to 1944 (as part of the City of Greater Manila) and Rizal's 1st congressional district from 1907 to 1941 and from 1945 to 1972.

Representation history

See also 
 Legislative districts of Makati

References 

Congressional districts of Metro Manila
Politics of Makati
1984 establishments in the Philippines
1986 disestablishments in the Philippines
1987 establishments in the Philippines
1998 disestablishments in the Philippines
At-large congressional districts of the Philippines
Former congressional districts of the Philippines
Constituencies established in 1984
Constituencies disestablished in 1986
Constituencies established in 1987
Constituencies disestablished in 1998